John Leroy Hennessy (born September 22, 1952) is an American computer scientist, academician and businessman who serves as Chairman of Alphabet Inc. Hennessy is one of the founders of MIPS Computer Systems Inc. as well as Atheros and served as the tenth President of Stanford University. Hennessy announced that he would step down in the summer of 2016. He was succeeded as president by Marc Tessier-Lavigne. Marc Andreessen called him "the godfather of Silicon Valley."

Along with David Patterson, Hennessy was a recipient of the 2017 Turing Award for their work in developing the reduced instruction set computer (RISC) architecture, which is now used in 99% of new computer chips.

Early life and education 
Hennessy was raised in Huntington, New York, as one of six children. His father was an aerospace engineer, and his mother was a teacher before raising her children.

He earned his bachelor's degree in electrical engineering from Villanova University, and his master's degree and Doctor of Philosophy in computer science from Stony Brook University.

Career and research
Hennessy became a Stanford faculty member in 1977. In 1981, he began the MIPS project to investigate RISC processors, and in 1984, he used his sabbatical year to found MIPS Computer Systems Inc. to commercialize the technology developed by his research. In 1987, he became the Willard and Inez Kerr Bell Endowed Professor of Electrical Engineering and Computer Science.

Hennessy served as director of Stanford's Computer System Laboratory (1989–93), a research center run by Stanford's Electrical Engineering and Computer Science departments. He was chair of the Department of Computer Science (1994–96) and Dean of the School of Engineering (1996–99).

In 1999, Stanford President Gerhard Casper appointed Hennessy to succeed Condoleezza Rice as Provost of Stanford University. When Casper stepped down to focus on teaching in 2000, the Stanford Board of Trustees named Hennessy to succeed Casper as president. In 2008, Hennessy earned a salary of $1,091,589 ($702,771 base salary, $259,592 deferred benefits, $129,226 non-tax benefits), the 23rd highest among all American university presidents.

Hennessy has served as a board member of Google (later Alphabet Inc.), Cisco Systems, Atheros Communications, and the Gordon and Betty Moore Foundation. He was elected to the American Philosophical Society in 2008.

On October 14, 2010, Hennessy was presented a khata by the 14th Dalai Lama before the latter addressed Maples Pavilion.

In December 2010, Hennessy coauthored an editorial with Harvard University President Drew Gilpin Faust urging the passage of the DREAM Act; the legislation did not pass the 111th United States Congress.

In 2013, Hennessy became a judge for the inaugural Queen Elizabeth Prize for Engineering. He has remained on the judging panel for the subsequent awards in 2015 and 2017.

In June 2015, Hennessy announced that he would step down as Stanford president in summer 2016.

In 2016, Hennessy co-founded the Knight-Hennessy Scholars program; he serves as its inaugural director. The program has a $750 million endowment to fully fund graduate students at Stanford for up to three years. The inaugural class of 51 scholars from 21 countries arrived at Stanford in the fall of 2018.

In February 2018, Hennessy was announced as the new Chairman of Alphabet Inc., Google's parent company.

Hennessy has a history of strong interest and involvement in college-level computer education. He co-authored, with David Patterson, two well-known books on computer architecture, Computer Organization and Design: the Hardware/Software Interface and Computer Architecture: A Quantitative Approach, which introduced the DLX RISC architecture. They have been widely used as textbooks for graduate and undergraduate courses since 1990.

Hennessy also contributed to updating Donald Knuth's MIX processor to the MMIX. Both are model computers used in Knuth's classic series, The Art of Computer Programming. MMIX is Knuth's DLX equivalent.

Awards and honors 
 National Academy of Engineering : 1992 For innovations in computer architecture and software techniques for reduced instruction set computers (RISC), and for quantitative evaluation methods for modern computer architectures.

 BBVA Foundation Frontiers of Knowledge Award 2020 in Information and Communication Technologies.
 In 2020, he received from the UC Berkeley Academic Senate the Clark Kerr Award for distinguished leadership in higher education. 
 In 2022, he was awarded the Charles Stark Draper Prize by the National Academy of Engineering alongside Steve Furber, David Patterson and Sophie Wilson for contributions to the invention, development, and implementation of reduced instruction set computer (RISC) chips.

Selected publications 
 Computer Architecture: A Quantitative Approach

Personal life
Hennessy is married to Andrea Berti who he met in high school.

References 

American computer scientists
Computer designers
1952 births
Living people
American corporate directors
Directors of Alphabet Inc.
Fellows of the Association for Computing Machinery
Members of the United States National Academy of Engineering
Members of the United States National Academy of Sciences
Presidents of Stanford University
Provosts of Stanford University
Seymour Cray Computer Engineering Award recipients
Stanford University School of Engineering faculty
Stanford University Department of Electrical Engineering faculty
Scientists from California
Villanova University alumni
Stony Brook University alumni
MIPS Technologies
20th-century American scientists
21st-century American scientists
Fellow Members of the IEEE
Fellows of the American Academy of Arts and Sciences
Turing Award laureates
American university and college faculty deans
Silicon Valley people
IEEE Medal of Honor recipients